Jouko Grip (born January 10, 1949, in Pälkäne) is a Paralympic athlete who has won medals in both the Summer and Winter Games. Most of his medals were in Nordic skiing. He is Finnish and has polio in his left hand. In 2006 he was inducted into the Paralympic Hall of Fame. He competed at the Summer Paralympics twice, in 1984 and 1988, and participated in track and field athletics both times, winning two gold medals in the 400 and 1500 metre races in 1984. He competed in seven consecutive Winter Paralympics, from 1980 to 2002, and won a total of ten gold and five silver medals. Two of his winter gold medals were won in the biathlon and the remainder of his winter medals were from cross-country skiing.

References 

Living people
1949 births
Paralympic athletes of Finland
Athletes (track and field) at the 1984 Summer Paralympics
Athletes (track and field) at the 1988 Summer Paralympics
Paralympic biathletes of Finland
Biathletes at the 1988 Winter Paralympics
Biathletes at the 1992 Winter Paralympics
Biathletes at the 1994 Winter Paralympics
Paralympic cross-country skiers of Finland
Cross-country skiers at the 1980 Winter Paralympics
Cross-country skiers at the 1984 Winter Paralympics
Cross-country skiers at the 1988 Winter Paralympics
Cross-country skiers at the 1992 Winter Paralympics
Cross-country skiers at the 1994 Winter Paralympics
Cross-country skiers at the 1998 Winter Paralympics
Cross-country skiers at the 2002 Winter Paralympics
Paralympic gold medalists for Finland
Paralympic silver medalists for Finland
Medalists at the 1980 Winter Paralympics
Medalists at the 1984 Winter Paralympics
Medalists at the 1988 Winter Paralympics
Medalists at the 1992 Winter Paralympics
Medalists at the 1994 Winter Paralympics
Finnish male biathletes
Paralympic medalists in athletics (track and field)
Paralympic medalists in cross-country skiing
Paralympic medalists in biathlon
20th-century Finnish people
21st-century Finnish people